Willie Mailey (13 June 1943 – 22 June 1992) was a Scottish professional football goalkeeper who played for Everton, Crewe Alexandra and Altrincham.

Honours
with Crewe Alexandra
Football League Fourth Division fourth-place promotion: 1967–68

References

1943 births
1992 deaths
Footballers from West Dunbartonshire
Scottish footballers
Association football goalkeepers
Everton F.C. players
Crewe Alexandra F.C. players
Altrincham F.C. players
Whitchurch Alport F.C. players
English Football League players